Friedemann Vogel (born 1 August 1979) is a German ballet dancer who performs with the Stuttgart Ballet as a Principal dancer and as a frequent guest artist at major ballet companies around the world including La Scala Theatre Ballet in Milan and the Bolshoi Ballet in Moscow. He has been awarded several prestigious dance prizes including the Prix de Lausanne (1997), Prix de Luxembourg (1997), Eurocity Competition in Italy, USA International Ballet Competition (1998) and Erik Bruhn Prize (2002). In September 2015, he was awarded the national title Kammertänzer - the highest honor in Germany that can be bestowed on a dancer. In the following year, 2016, he was awarded the "Prix Maya" for "Outstanding Dancer" alongside Aurélie Dupont and Diana Vishneva. In 2019, he was elected "Dancer of the Year" by the prestigious trade journal TANZ, making him the only male dancer worldwide ever to receive this distinction more than once. In 2020, he is honoured with the "Outstanding Performer" Award by the prestigious German Dance Prize for his longstanding and illustrious international career, and as a unique dance interpreter, with his combination of intense emotional portrayals and excellent technique. In 2021, he was selected to give the official International Dance Day message by the International Theatre Institute - the world's largest performing arts organisation, under the patronage of UNESCO. In 2022, Friedemann was appointed jury member of the prestigious Prix de Lausanne, 25 years after he was a prize winner himself.

The first-ever full-length documentary on Vogel "Friedemann Vogel - Verkörperung des Tanzes" made its TV premiere on German TV channel SWR on 10 April 2020, and is available to watch online in the ARD Mediathek until 17 February 2023. Friedemann is also featured as one of four protagonists in the ZDF/ARTE documentary "Dance on!" which premiered on ARTE on 20 November 2022, and will be available to watch online in selected countries.

Early life and training 
Vogel was born in Stuttgart, Germany. He studied at John Cranko Schule in Stuttgart. After receiving the John Gilpin Scholarship from Princess Antoinette de Monaco, he completed his ballet training at Princess Grace Academy of Classical Dance in Monte Carlo.

Career 
Vogel embarked on his professional dance career with the Stuttgart Ballet in September 1998 as a member of the Corps de ballet. In 1997 to 1998, he won the cash prize from the Prix de Lausanne (1997), Gold Medal from Prix de Luxembourg (1997), Gold Medal from Eurocity Competition in Italy (1997) and Bronze from USA International Ballet Competition (1998). In 2002, Vogel won the Erik Bruhn Prize with the Pas de deux from "In the Middle, Somewhat Elevated", a coveted prize awarded to dancers known to have "technical ability, artistic achievement and dedication".
In the same year he won the Erik Bruhn Prize, Vogel was promoted to a Principal Dancer in the Stuttgart Ballet where he performs the leading role for many well-known ballets such as Romeo and Juliet, Giselle, Swan Lake, Sleeping Beauty, La Bayadere, Raymonda, Onegin, The Lady of the Camellias, Mayerling and Boléro. Besides regularly headlining ballet galas around the world, Vogel has also been invited to perform as guest artist by the following companies (in alphabetical order): 
 Ballets de Santiago de Chile
 Bayerisches Staatsballett
 Béjart Ballet Lausanne
 Bolshoi Ballet Theatre Moscow
 English National Ballet
 Finnish National Ballet
 Hong Kong Ballet
 Korean National Ballet
 Mariinsky Theater St.Petersburg
 National Ballet of China
 Royal Swedish Ballet
 Sarasota Ballet
 Staatsballett Berlin
 Teatro alla Scala Milano
 Teatro dell'Opera di Roma
 Tokyo Ballet
 Vienna State Ballet
In 2015, Vogel was awarded by the Ministry of Science, Research and the Arts of the Federal State of Baden-Württemberg the national title of "Kammertänzer"- the highest honor in Germany for a dancer. In the following year, 2016, he was awarded the "Prix Maya" for "Outstanding Dancer" alongside Aurélie Dupont and Diana Vishneva. In 2019, he was elected "Dancer of the Year" by the international critics' survey of trade journal TANZ for the second time in his career. In 2020, he is honoured with the "Outstanding Performer" Award by the prestigious German Dance Prize for his longstanding and illustrious international career, and as a unique dance interpreter, with his combination of intense emotional portrayals and excellent technique. In 2021, he was appointed the Message Author for International Dance Day by the International Theatre Institute, which selects an outstanding personality each year to compose a message to celebrate dance in all its forms, and to transcend political and cultural boundaries through its universal language.

In 2019, Vogel launched the "Inspired by Porsche" campaign  - a collaboration named "Creation of the Day" by leading German marketing & media journal W&V, which commended Porsche for their authentic choice of the ballet star as a "brand ambassador". The same campaign has won two "Awards of Excellence" in the Academy of Interactive & Visual Arts 2020 International Communicator Awards.

In 2020, in response to the pandemic, Friedemann Vogel launched "Physical Conversation" - a limited-edition art box developed in collaboration with photographer Oliver Kröning, of which all 300 boxes sold out with four days, and all proceeds were donated to the Olgäle Stiftung - a foundation supporting sick children in Stuttgart. In 2021, photos from "Physical Conversation" will be presented in a special exhibition curated by the Galerie Kernweine in the garden museum of the StadtPalais Stuttgart from 9 May to 30 June. Nearly 10.000 Euros was raised in all for the Olgäle Stiftung.

In 2021, Friedemann Vogel made his choreographic debut with "Not in my hands". Created with former Stuttgart Ballet soloist Thomas Lempertz and performed to Mozart's "Requiem", the solo is Vogel's attempt to encapsulate the overwhelming impact of the pandemic on performing artists.

Reception 
In addition to being recognized for his dancing through many prestigious dance awards, Vogel was named "Outstanding Dancer" by the critics in the Ballettanz magazine in 2005 and 2009, as well as "Dancer of the Year" in 2010 and 2019 by the prestigious industry magazine Tanz, which described him as "a world star who never lost the ground beneath his feet... now at the top of his game".
The Dance Europe magazine named Vogel "Outstanding Dancer" in 2010, Danza&Danza magazine named him "Best Male Dancer" in 2011 and he was given the award of "Best Male Dancer" by the Positano Premio la Danza – Leonide Massine in 2012. 
Described as "one of the most passionate and elegant male dancers on the international scene" by the Dance International Magazine, Vogel is widely acknowledged for his purity of movement and exceptional versatility, critically acclaimed for his classical ballet roles and contemporary work alike. In particular, Vogel has received rave reviews for his interpretation of Maurice Béjart's Boléro ("Friedemann is kult." - Cannstatter Zeitung), Kenneth MacMillan's Mayerling ("absolutely sensational" - Dance Europe, John Cranko's Onegin ("the most elegant & elegiac Onegin of all time" - Suedwest Presse). Ballet2000 further praised the superlative dancer for "allying physical and technical control with a deep, sensitive artistry". For his 20th anniversary with the Stuttgart Ballet in 2019, Stuttgarter Zeitung interviewed Vogel, who "conquered the world of ballet from Stuttgart".

Vogel's collaboration with Rome Opera Ballet and Christian Dior  in Italy and worldwide, as part of the lead couple in the new ballet Nuit Blanche choreographed by Sébastien Bertaud, and wearing a costume specially designed for him by Dior's artistic director Maria Grazia Chiuri.

"Fascinating Movement" - the Inspired by Porsche campaign that Vogel launched in May 2019 - was named "Creation of the Day" by leading German marketing & media journal W&V.
In 2020, in response to the global COVID-19 pandemic, Vogel taught a voluntary virtual ballet improvisation class with choreographer Sébastien Bertaud as part of the "Dior & Dance" initiative, to encourage dancers to keep up with their training from home and to offer the public a glimpse of the daily life of professional dancers. The video received much positive response from the dance sector, and has been publicised online widely by fashion and lifestyle magazines from around the world.

The British Theatre Guide singled out Vogel as the "standout one" and that he "soars like a bird" in his Tristesse performance. He was also lauded by Debra Craine of The Times for his performance in Tristesse: "All performers were outstanding, but Vogel in particular lifted Tristesse on to another plane with the sheer beauty and heart of his dancing." A New York Times dance reviewer named Vogel as a "handsome, appealing, tall dancer whom I hope New York comes to know better" for his performance in Marguerite and Armand.

Several dance blogs have also praised Vogel: Dancetabs commended Vogel for being a "beautiful, lyrical, light, clean dancer" and that the pas de deux was a "poignant moment" in Tristesse.  Artmeme praised Vogel for his "noteworthy and outstanding presence on stage" and called him an "exquisite German dancer".

His performances as Des Grieux in Kenneth MacMillan's Manon together with Eleonora Abbagnato and Rome Opera Ballet were highly anticipated and celebrated by both public and press.

Italian newspapers applauded Friedemann Vogel for being an "extraordinary performer": "His heart meets that of the young Des Grieux: marvelous in the first solo, Friedemann Vogel is here (...) a dancer with a crystalline technique and an elegant gesture, a poet in love capable of suspending time in poses with perfect aplomb and twirling with velvety."
Italian TV coverage of his guest performances show the great reception Vogel has received for his interpretation.

Amongst the 40 international ballet stars participating in the 15th World Ballet Festival in Japan, Friedemann Vogel was the only one invited to be interviewed by Japanese TV Channel NHK on the programme "Gogo Nama" to promote the event, a testament to the great popularity he enjoys in Asia and especially in Japan. Vogel was also voted one of the most popular ballet dancers in Japan in 2019 by the audience survey of Dance Magazine Japan.

Vogel continues to gain the attention of international dance, travel and fashion media in Germany, Italy, Russia, China, Japan, Korea, United States of America, United Kingdom, Singapore  Taiwan, Hong Kong, and France.

List of ballets/roles performed 
The following table lists the productions Vogel is the lead dancer:

The following table lists roles specially created for Vogel:

Awards 
 2020 "Outstanding Performer" Award of German Dance Prize
 2016 "Prix Maya"
 2015 "Kammertänzer" of Germany
 2002 Erik Bruhn Prize
 1998 Bronze in USA International Ballet Competition
 1997 Gold Medal in Prix de Luxembourg
 1997 Gold Medal in Eurocity Competition in Italy
 1997 Cash Prize in Prix de Lausanne

References

External links 
 Friedemann Vogel's official website
 Stuttgart Ballet's official website

Living people
German male ballet dancers
Prix de Lausanne winners
Male dancers
1979 births
Stuttgart Ballet